Sarkhur Tahruyi (also Romanized as Sarkhūr Ţāhrūyī; also known as Sarkhor) is a village in Sirik Rural District, Byaban District, Minab County, Hormozgan Province, Iran. At the 2006 census, its population was 213, in 32 families.

References 

Populated places in Minab County